Tampereentie (Finnish; Tammerforsvägen in Swedish) is a ward of Turku, Finland, also known as Ward 6. The ward is located to the north of the city centre and named after the major route that passes through the ward in the direction of Tampere.

The ward has a population of 14,010 and an annual population decrease of 0.75%. 12.88% of the ward's population are under 15 years old, while 20.27% are over 65. The ward's linguistic makeup is 93.35% Finnish, 1.88% Swedish, and 4.76% other.

Districts
The ward consists of five districts. Two of them are divided with other wards.

Notes
 The district of Raunistula is divided between City Centre and Tampereentie.
 The district of Runosmäki is divided between Tampereentie and Kuninkoja.

See also 
Districts of Turku
Wards of Turku

Wards of Turku